The Schelf Church of St. Nicholas is an Evangelical Lutheran church dedicated to Saint Nicholas in the Schelfstadt quarter of Schwerin in Germany. The church is owned and used by a congregation within the Evangelical Lutheran Church in Northern Germany. It was originally built in 1238, but was rebuilt in 1713 in the Baroque style after destruction by a storm. It is the family burial place of the House of Mecklenburg-Schwerin, including Sophia Louise of Mecklenburg-Schwerin.

Bibliography

 Leonhard Christoph Sturm: Architectonisches Bedencken Von Protestantischer Kleinen Kirchen Figur und Einrichtung/ An Eine Durchläuchtige Person über einem gewissen Casu gestellet/ Und Als eine offtmahls vorkommende Sache zum gemeinen Nutzen im Druck gegeben/ Mit dazu gehörigen Rissen. Hamburg: Schiller 1712
 Edgar Jakobs:	Etwas von der Schelfkirche. In: Monatshefte für Mecklenburg. Schwerin, Bd. 14 (1938), 165, S. 397-398 (Digitalisat)

Buildings and structures in Schwerin
Schwerin Schelf
Schwerin Schelf
Schwerin Schelf
Schwerin Schelf
1713 establishments in the Holy Roman Empire